Theistic Humanism is the combination of humanistic ideals, particularly the idea that ideals and morals stem from society, with a belief in the supernatural and transcendental.

It is frequently invoked as a form of spiritual opposition to monotheism.

Theistic Humanism in African Philosophy 

In Southern Africa, indigenous humanism is popularly associated with the Ubuntu philosophy, and its fusion with Traditional African religion is often referred to as Theistic Humanism. Ubuntu asserts that society, not a transcendent being, gives human beings their humanity. This form of theistic humanism has frequently been associated with opposition to globalisation.

References 

Humanism
Philosophical schools and traditions
Philosophy of life
Philosophy of religion